Amyloathelia is a genus of fungi in the family Amylocorticiaceae. The genus contains three species distributed in Europe and South America.

References

External links

Amylocorticiales